David Faimafiliotamaitai Ainuu (born 20 November 1999) is a rugby union player who plays as a prop for Toulouse in France's Top14 and for the United States men's national team. Ainuu has also represented the United States with multiple age-grade sides—including the United States national under-20 rugby union team.

Early life
David Ainuu was born in American Samoa on 20 November 1999. Ainuu was first introduced to rugby when he was the water boy for his brother's team. He first played rugby himself with Prairie RFC in Yelm, Washington. Ainuu was also selected to play for the Washington Loggers, Rugby Washington's state-level representative side. Ainuu attended Capital High School in Olympia, Washington.

Club career
Prior to December 2017, Ainuu played rugby for Seattle Saracens in the CDI Premier League. In December 2017, Ainuu signed a six-month academy contract with Toulouse in France's Top14. (Ainuu had previously agreed to join the Seattle Seawolves for Major League Rugby's inaugural 2018 season, but ended that agreement before the season began in order to play at the higher-level of competition.) In September 2018, Ainuu re-signed with Toulouse, committing to the club through the 2020–21 season. Ainuu made his Top 14 debut for Toulouse on 23 September 2018, appearing as a halftime-substitute in a 66–15 defeat to Montpellier.

International career

USA Junior All-Americans
Ainuu was named to the United States national under-20 rugby union team (Junior All-Americans) ahead of a pair of 2018 World Rugby Under 20 Trophy qualification matches against Canada.

USA Eagles
Ainuu was first named to the roster of the United States senior national team ahead of the 2018 June rugby union tests, but did not make an appearance for the team at that time, instead playing for the Junior All-Americans. Ainuu made his debut for the Eagles on 10 November 2018, appearing as a substitute, in the Eagles' 30–29 victory over Samoa during the 2018 end-of-year tests. Ainuu made his first appearance in the Eagles' starting lineup on 2 March 2019 in a 32–25 defeat to Uruguay during the 2019 Americas Rugby Championship.

References

1999 births
Living people
United States international rugby union players
Rugby union props
American Samoan rugby union players
Stade Toulousain players
Expatriate rugby union players in France
American Samoan expatriate rugby union players
American Samoan expatriate sportspeople in France